is a text-based adventure game developed by Pax Softnica under Nintendo EAD and published by Nintendo for the Family Computer Disk System in 1991. The game was never released outside Japan.

Time Twist was sold across two separate discs released on the same day, and completion of the first disc is required to activate the second. Many members of the Famicom Fairytales: Shin Onigashima and Famicom Fairytales: Yuyuki staff also participated in the development of this game.

Development

The Nintendo EAD and Pax Softnica collaboration began on Shin Onigashima and continued through Yūyūki. On the original two works, Nintendo EAD handled the story design and character designs with Tatsuya Hishida leading the efforts as creative director on the behalf of Nintendo. Development on Time Twist shifted towards Pax Softnica and designer Keiji Terui as Nintendo EAD only provided the music and production tasks.

Gameplay

The game is played by choosing text commands given on the screen. The nameless protagonist is a young boy whose soul becomes separated from his body by a devil, allowing him to temporarily take control of other humans and animals. He must use this ability to thwart the plans of the time-traveling devil and return to his own body.

The game takes place in real historical locations and deals with serious themes such as religion, war and racism. Despite the serious setting, the game handles the topics with some light comic relief. Logic puzzles and historical trivia questions are presented over the course of the game, and the player must solve these correctly in order to progress. Unlike in previous Nintendo adventure games, players cannot get a "Game Over". Making a wrong choice will simply halt progress or return them to the previous scene to try again.

Like the Famicom Mukashibanashi games, all text in Time Twist is presented in hiragana, including names of non-Japanese objects, people, and countries, which would normally be written in katakana. The only sections of the game that contain katakana and kanji are the title screen and staff roll.

Plot

Introduction
The year is 1995, the impending turn of the 20th century is instilling fear and uncertainty in mankind, and fortune-telling shows have become popular.

On September 25, 1995, a young boy living in Tokyo hears on a fortune-telling show that he will meet the girl of his dreams in a museum located outside the city limits. He visits the "Devil Museum" and meets a girl inside, but a sudden earthquake cuts their meeting short. The boy recites the incantation from the fortune-telling show said to "capture the heart of the girl of his dreams", but the incantation destroys the seal on a vase containing the devil.

The reanimated devil takes control of the boy's body, leaving the boy trapped in the devil's decaying body. He chases the devil to the house of Dr. Simon, a physics scientist hiding from the media. The devil has stolen the scientist's time machine called the "Time Belt" and uses it to travel back in time. The young boy's soul is also pulled back into the past by the Time Belt.

Settings and characters
Below is a table listing the various events and historical personages that appear throughout the game. Joan of Arc, Alexander the Great, Abraham Lincoln and Jesus of Nazareth are described as the "Children of God," who have been sent to quell the disturbances caused by the devil.

Important items
Certain items appear in each age which play a key role in completing the game. All of these items (excluding the Devil's portrait) were collected by the museum owner and displayed at the museum as historical artifacts.

Devil's portrait
A portrait drawn by the owner of the museum using artistic techniques developed in all different parts of the world. It was not displayed in the museum because it was never completed; it hangs on the wall of the museum owner's home. The depiction of the devil closely resembles that of the protagonist.
Box of Sabbath
A weighty box engraved with unsettling patterns. The religion that made a covenant with the devil hid their contract within this box.
Gypsy charm
An ancient good-luck charm placed within a pendant. An incantation that dispels the devil is engraved on its star-shaped metal plate. It was given to an American soldier by a prisoner of war.
Bell of admonition
A small hand bell used by the Egyptian pharaoh to repel the devil. An Athenian doctor received it from a Spartan soldier as payment for his services.
Devil's claw
A statue in the likeness of the sharp, clawlike hand of the devil. Was used as a religious icon by worshipers of the devil.
Demon sealing vase
A beautifully engraved droplet vase presented to the infant Jesus of Nazareth by the three magi. Jesus seals the devil into this vase later during his life.

History
Time Twist was the last packaged release on the Disk System, released eight months after the release of the Super Famicom in Japan. Nintendo did not promote the game on television, as they had with their previous adventure games. The game was never given a North American release, due to its mature and religious themes conflicting with Nintendo of America's strict censorship policies at the time.

The game's rarity led to the packaged version being exchanged at prices higher than the original 2,600 yen. The rising price of the packaged release made the disk re-writing service a cheaper alternative to buying the game at 500 yen. Nintendo ended the re-writing service for Time Twist in Autumn of 2002; a year earlier than the end of all Disk System re-writing in September 2003.

See also
 Shin Onigashima
 Yūyūki
 Famicom Bunko: Hajimari no Mori

References

External links
Time Twist at NinDB

1991 video games
Adventure games
Alternate history video games
American Civil War video games
Cultural depictions of Abraham Lincoln
Cultural depictions of Adolf Hitler
Cultural depictions of Alexander the Great
Cultural depictions of Jesus
Cultural depictions of Mary, mother of Jesus
Episodic video games
Famicom Disk System games
Famicom Disk System-only games
Fiction set in the 2nd century BC
Fiction set in the 5th century BC
Japan-exclusive video games
Nintendo Entertainment Analysis and Development games
Nintendo games
Pax Softnica games
Single-player video games
Fiction about the Devil
The Holocaust in popular culture
Video games about time travel
Video games about Nazi Germany
Video games developed in Japan
Video games set in 1995
Video games set in Athens
Video games set in Atlanta
Video games set in France
Video games set in Germany
Video games set in the 15th century
Video games set in Tokyo
Works about Joan of Arc
Works set in the 1420s
World War II video games